Kermit Smith is an American college baseball coach and former player. Smith is the head coach of the Appalachian State Mountaineers baseball team.

Playing career
Smith attended Pfeiffer University, where he was a member of the Falcons baseball team.

Coaching career
After a year as an assistant at Belmont Abbey College, Smith was named the head coach of the Crusaders at the age of 23. In 2009, Belmont Abbey advanced to the Division II College World Series where they finished 4th. Smith was named the Conference Carolinas Coach of the Year.

In 2009, Smith was named the head coach at Lander University. Smith lead the 2014 Bearcats squad to a school 52–9 season, winning the Peach Belt Conference Coach of the Year honors.

On July 14, 2016, Smith was named the head coach of the Appalachian State Mountaineers baseball program.

Head coaching record

See also
 List of current NCAA Division I baseball coaches

References

External links
Appalachian State Mountaineers bio

Living people
Pfeiffer Falcons baseball players
Belmont Abbey Crusaders baseball coaches
Lander Bearcats baseball coaches
Appalachian State Mountaineers baseball coaches
Year of birth missing (living people)